Juventus F.C. finished second in Serie A and reached the final of the Coppa Italia in this season.

Squad

Transfers

Competitions

Serie A

League table

Results by round

Matches

Coppa Italia

Round of 16

Eightfinals

Quarterfinals

Semifinals

Final

Statistics

Players Statistics

References

Juventus F.C. seasons
Juventus